Hanson is a town in Plymouth County, Massachusetts, United States. Part of Greater Boston, Hanson is located 20 miles (32 km) south of Boston and is one of the inland towns of the South Shore. The population was 10,639 at the 2020 census.

History
Hanson was first settled in 1632 as the western parish of Pembroke. The town was officially incorporated in 1820, and was named for Maryland publisher of the Federal Republican newspaper and U.S. Senator Alexander Contee Hanson. Hanson was a champion of free speech and freedom of the press, and he was severely beaten and his newspaper offices were attacked and destroyed by an angry mob after he published an article that was critical of the administration shortly after the outbreak of the War of 1812.

The town's early industry revolved around farming, as well as bog iron and quarrying. Mills also popped up along the rivers during the nineteenth century. Today the town is mostly residential, with some farming and cranberry farming. Ocean Spray was first started by several bogs in Hanson, and remained headquartered in Hanson before moving to Plymouth in September 1977.

Hanson was home to the Plymouth County Hospital, a tuberculosis sanatorium, located on Bonney Hill, opening in 1919 and remaining open until 1992.

Geography
It is the 250th largest town in the Commonwealth, over seven square miles smaller than the average. Hanson is considered one of the inland towns of Massachusetts's South Shore, and is bordered by Rockland and Hanover to the north, Pembroke to the east, Halifax to the south, East Bridgewater to the west, and Whitman to the northwest.

Mostly flatland, the highest elevation in town is Bonney Hill at 152 ft, making it one of the highest points in Plymouth County. Another hill of prominence is Almshouse Hill near the current day center of town and named for the Josiah Cushing home (built in 1763), which was purchased in 1837 and used as an almshouse until 1902.

Hanson, like many towns in central Plymouth County, is dominated by lakes, rivers and swamps. The largest ponds include Oldham Pond along the Pembroke town line, Indian Head Pond (the source of Indian Head Brook) just south of Oldham Pond, Maquan Pond, located east of the center of the town, and Wampatuck Pond, located in the center of the town. In addition to Indian Head Brook, the town has several other brooks and rivers, including the Shumatuscacant River and Poor Meadow Brook to the west, and White Oak Brook to the south. To the north of town lies the Little Cedar Swamp, along Indian Head Brook. There is a small town forest and two camps, Rainbow Camp and Camp Kiwanee, within the town as well. Burrage Pond Wildlife Management Area lies mainly in the section of town called Burrage or South Hanson.

Neighborhoods
Historically, the town of Hanson was home to a number of unique and distinct villages. From the town's early history into the 1900s, the United States Postal Service maintained offices at Hanson Center (Harding's Corner), North Hanson (North Hanson Railroad Station), Bryantville, Monponsett and South Hanson. By 1940, only the South Hanson and Monponsett Post Offices remained open, with Bryantville being moved to the Pembroke side of the road. That same year, the Post Office would change the South Hanson name to just Hanson. Today, some distinct neighborhoods still exist, while South Hanson and Monponsett tend to be the most well known. 
South Hanson: Formerly the center of town during the industrial era. South Hanson follows Massachusetts Route 27 from the border of Pembroke to Tri-Town (where East Bridgewater, Whitman, and Hanson all intersect). South Hanson was formerly home to the Plymouth County Hospital, a tuberculosis sanatorium, as well as the original Ocean Spray Cranberry Co. facility. The historic and now abandoned South Hanson train station building sits adjacent to the modern MBTA Hanson station. Much of the main one-mile stretch of the South Hanson center suffers from urban decay and deindustrialization given its large number of run down buildings in a once prosperous area, though revival attempts have seen some small business open up in the historic buildings.
Monponsett: On the southern border with Halifax and has its own post office and zip code (02350). Monponsett is named for the Monponsett Twin Lakes which lie along much of the Hanson/Halifax border.
Burrage: In South Hanson and named for Albert Burrage, one of the town's most prominent industrialists. He formed the Atlantic Dyestuff Company which had its first factory where present-day Hawks Avenue is located. Litecontrol, now of Plympton, had used the historic industrial complex before relocating. The historic factory was demolished in 2016. Burrage was also previously home to a library and a hotel, both of which closed in the early 1900s.  Burrage includes portions of Pleasant Street, South Street and Reed Street.
Brentwood: The north-eastern region of Hanson, including Brook Street, State Street, Gorwin Drive, and their side streets.

Demographics

As of the census of 2000, there were 9,495 people, 3,123 households, and 2,545 families residing in the town.

There were 3,123 households, out of which 40.3% had children under the age of 18 living with them, 69.6% were married couples living together, 8.7% had a female householder with no husband present, and 18.5% were non-families. 14.8% of all households were made up of individuals, and 6.1% had someone living alone who was 65 years of age or older. The average household size was 3.03 and the average family size was 3.38.

In the town, the population was spread out, with 28.2% under the age of 18, 6.9% from 18 to 24, 31.1% from 25 to 44, 25.1% from 45 to 64, and 8.6% who were 65 years of age or older. The median age was 36 years. For every 100 females, there were 97.2 males. For every 100 females age 18 and over, there were 93.7 males.

The median income for a household in the town was $62,687, and the median income for a family was $68,560. Males had a median income of $46,508 versus $31,337 for females. The per capita income for the town was $23,727. About 2.8% of families and 3.8% of the population were below the poverty line, including 2.3% of those under age 18 and 11.6% of those age 65 or over.

Statistically, Hanson is the 180th most populous and the 154th most densely populated town in Massachusetts. It is just below the median in terms of population, and below the average but above the median in terms of density.

Government

On the national level, Hanson is a community of the Ninth congressional district, currently represented by Bill Keating. The state's senior (Class I) member of the United States Senate is Elizabeth Warren. The junior (Class II) senator is Ed Markey.

On the state level, Hanson is represented in the Massachusetts House of Representatives as a part of the Sixth Plymouth district, which includes the towns of Duxbury, Pembroke and portions of Halifax. The town is represented in the Massachusetts Senate as a part of the Second Plymouth and Bristol district, which includes Brockton, Halifax, Hanover, Whitman and portions of East Bridgewater and Easton. The town is patrolled by the First (Norwell) Barracks of Troop D of the Massachusetts State Police.

Hanson is governed by the open town meeting form of government and is led by current Town Administrator Lisa Green and a five-member Board of Selectmen. The town hall is located on the shore of Wampatuck Pond, at the town center. In the same area are the Fire Department headquarters and the Hanson Public Library, which is a member of the SAILS Library Network. The Hanson Police Department headquarters, built in 2007, is located on Main Street (Rte. 27). There is a branch firehouse along Route 27 near the train station, and the town's post office is located near the intersection of Routes 27 and 58. Town meetings are held at the Hanson Middle School Auditorium.

Education

Hanson shares a Pre-K through grade 12 school district (Whitman-Hanson Regional School District) with neighboring Whitman. The yearly operating assessments to both Towns are determined on the basis of student population. The town of Hanson owns the Hanson Middle School, and two elementary schools, Indian Head and Maquan, and leases them to the Whitman Hanson Regional School District, which is responsible for keeping the buildings in good repair. Maquan Elementary School has closed, and Indian Head Elementary serves students from kindergarten through fourth grades. Hanson Middle School serves students in grades five through eight. The town sends their students to Whitman-Hanson Regional High School, which is shared with the neighboring town of Whitman. The school was recently rebuilt through part of a $50 million project. It is located behind the previous building (which has been torn down and replaced with new athletic fields, including a synthetic turf football field) along Route 27 on the town line. Whitman-Hanson's teams are known as the Panthers, and their colors are red and black. Their chief rival is nearby Abington High, whom they play in the annual Thanksgiving Day football game.

In addition to Whitman-Hanson, students may choose to attend South Shore Vocational Technical High School in Hanover free of charge.

The nearest colleges to Hanson are Massasoit Community College in Brockton, Bridgewater State University in Bridgewater, and Quincy College in Quincy.

Transportation
There are no freeways in Hanson, which is equidistant between Routes 3 and 24. The main state routes through town are Route 14 and Route 58, which intersect and run coextensively for a short stretch in the middle of town. Route 27 also passes through the town, following a portion of the Whitman and East Bridgewater borders before crossing the southern section of town.

The town lies along the Kingston-Plymouth line of the MBTA's commuter rail service, with a stop along Route 27. There is a small airport, Cranland Airport, which serves only small aircraft. The nearest national and international air service is at Logan International Airport in Boston.

Notable people

 John Delaney, college baseball coach at Quinnipiac
 Albert Hall (athlete), American hammer throw champion, who competed in the Olympics four times
 Mimi Imfurst, drag queen. Best known for competing on RuPaul's Drag Race
 Alex Karalexis, professional fighter; competed in the Ultimate Fighting Championship, World Extreme Cagefighting; original cast member on The Ultimate Fighter 1
 Rocky Marciano, the only undefeated heavyweight boxing champion; had a house at 867 Main Street in South Hanson
 Kristen Merlin, singer/songwriter, guitarist
 Kristie Mewis, professional soccer player currently signed with NJ/NY Gotham FC and the United States women's national soccer team
 Samantha Mewis, professional soccer player currently signed with the Kansas City Current and the United States women's national soccer team
 Maura Murray, resident of Hanson, missing person who vanished without a trace in 2004 in New Hampshire whose case has gained international attention and media coverage
 Albert C. Read (1887–1967), Rear Admiral; Commander/Navigator of the NC-4, the first aircraft to complete a transatlantic flight in 1919
 Tiffany Scott, 2002 Olympic figure skater
 Jimmy Slyde (1927–2008), tap dancer

References

External links
 Everything you need to know

 
Towns in Plymouth County, Massachusetts
Towns in Massachusetts